Lili is a 1917 Hungarian comedy film directed by Cornelius Hintner. The film was first shown on 21 October 1917 at the Urania Theater in Budapest. Some sources list Bela Lugosi in the cast, but that is unverified.

Cast
In alphabetical order
 Ida Andorffy as Lili as a young woman
 Klára Peterdy as Lili as an older woman
 Sándor Góth
 Richard Kornay as Br. de la Grange
 Ila Lóth as Antoinin
 Cläre Lotto
 Charles Puffy (credited as Károly Huszár)
 Zoltán Szerémy
 Gusztáv Turán as René
 Károly Ujvári as Saint Hypothese
 Gusztáv Vándory

Production
The film is a comedy in four acts based on Hervé's operetta of the same name.

As late as September 1917, promotional material for the film claimed that Arisztid Olt (later known as Bela Lugosi) played Plinchard at both the younger and elder stage of his life. Advertisements and reviews of Lilis preview at the Uránia in Budapest in October 1917 have Gusztáv Vándory in the role of Plinchard/Tábornok. a 1918 issue of the Mozihét Kino-Woche published a series of pictures showing Vándory as Plinchard. Lugosi is not seen in any of the images. Gary Rhodes, a Lugosi biographer stated in 2020 that "there is no compelling evidence that Lugosi appeared in Lili."

Release and reception
Lili was screened for two weeks at Budapest's Coros Theater, an unprecedented amount of time.

References

Sources

External links

1917 films
1917 comedy films
Hungarian black-and-white films
Hungarian silent feature films
Hungarian films based on plays
Hungarian comedy films
1917 Austro-Hungarian films
Silent comedy films